Doc Watson & Son is the self-titled début album by Doc Watson and Merle Watson, released in 1965.

Reception

Allmusic critic Jim Smith wrote that the album "shows the duo's musical partnership already in full flower."

Track listing
 "Muskrat" (Traditional) – 2:54
 "Weary Blues" (Traditional) – 2:43
 "Medley: Fiddler's Dram/Whistling Rufus/Ragtime Annie (Raggedy Ann)" (Traditional) – 2:13
 "Dream of the Miner's Child" (Traditional) – 2:48
 "Rising Sun Blues" (Clarence Ashley) – 4:19
 "Mama Blues" (Doc Watson) – 2:20
 "We Shall All Be Reunited" (Robert Bateman) – 2:14
 "Little Stream of Whiskey" (Traditional) – 2:28
 "Little Sadie" (Traditional) – 2:01
 "Beaumont Rag" (Traditional) – 1:41
 "Otto Wood the Bandit" (Walter "The Kid" Smith) – 3:18
 "Faithful Soldier" (Traditional) – 3:12
 "Memphis Blues" (John Miller) – 1:36
 "Gonna Lay Down My Old Guitar" (Alton Delmore, Rabon Delmore) – 2:08

Personnel
Doc Watson – 6 & 12 string-guitar, harmonica, vocals
Merle Watson – guitar

Production notes
Produced by Ralph Rinzler
Cover photo by David Gahr
Design by Jules Halfant

References

1965 albums
Doc Watson albums
Vanguard Records albums
Collaborative albums